Acanthurus gahhm is a species of fish in the family Acanthuridae, the surgeonfishes. Its common name is black surgeonfish. It is endemic to the western Indian Ocean, where it occurs in the Red Sea, the Gulf of Aden and Socotra.

Description
This fish reaches up to 50 centimeters in length. It is oval in shape and laterally compressed. Like other surgeonfishes, it swims with its pectoral fins. The caudal fin has a crescent shape. The mouth is small and pointed. The body is black to dark brown, with a white ring around the base of the tail and a yellow stripe around the eyes. The pectoral fins are tipped with yellow.

Biology
This is a demersal fish. It lives on reefs and in lagoons and other sandy areas up to 40 meters deep.

This species is omnivorous, feeding on algae, zooplankton and other small invertebrates, and detritus. It is active during the day and may swim in groups or remain solitary.

Uses
This species is kept in aquaria and harvested for food.

References

External links
World Register of Marine Species: Acanthurus gahhm (Forsskål, 1775) 
 Integrated Taxonomic Information System (ITIS): Acanthurus gahhm  (Forsskål, 1775)
 Reef-guardian.com: Acanthurus gahhm - Poisson chirurgien noir à queue blanche 

Acanthuridae
Acanthurus
Fish of the Indian Ocean
Fish described in 1775
Taxa named by Peter Forsskål